The Islamic figure Husayn ibn Ali had four daughters: Ruqayya (Arabic: رُقَيَّة) Sakina, Fāṭima aṣ-Ṣughrā (Arabic: فَاطِمَة ٱلصُّغْرَىٰ, "Fatima the Younger") and Fāṭima al-Kubrā ("Fatima the Elder").

Ruqayya

Shi'ite narrative 
The story of Sukayna is one of the many emotional stories that Shī‘ī Muslims tell about Husayn and his martyrdom at the hands of Yazid's troops. The Battle of Karbala and the subsequent events at the court of Yazid are explained and mourned annually during the commemoration of the 10th of Muharram, also known as ‘Âshûrá’ (tenth day). According to these religious narrations, Sukayna suffered from fatigue and thirst on the forced march to Damascus, and later from cold and starvation in Yazid's dungeon.

Journey to Iraq and Shaam 
She accompanied her father when he traveled from Mecca to Kufa in Iraq. On the 2nd of Muharram, 61 AH (680 CE), Husayn and 72 of his family members and companions were forced to camp in the plains of Karbala by Yazid's army of 900000 men. According to the  Shī‘ī Muslims, Yazid ibn Mu'awiya was a tyrant Caliph who desired religious authority by obtaining the allegiance of Husayn, but the Imam would not give up his principles. On the 10th of Muharram, the Imam's household was attacked, a number of his companions were killed, and the survivors were made captives. The survivors included the Imam's sisters, wives, and daughters, including Sukayna, relatives of companions of the Imam, and his son, Ali Zayn al-Abidin, who did not participate in the battle, due to an illness. Sukayna, as with others, had been grieved over the killings. They had also suffered from thirst.

The survivors were marched by Yazid's army from Karbala to Kufa, where Sukayna received water from a sympathetic woman, and then to Damascus in Shaam. There was a lack of pity from the captors' part during the journey. Even at these times of hardship and misery, Ruqayya was sympathetic to others, such as her mother, whom she consoled her mother on the death of Ali al-Asghar.

Death and aftermath 
According to Shia Islamic narrations that are commemorated every year on the occasion of Ashura, after enduring the Battle of Karbala and the torturous journey to Damascus that followed it, Sukayna died at the age of four weeping over her father's head in Yazid palace hall where prisoner were initially stayed and, her body was originally buried at nearby site. Centuries later, an ʿĀlim (Scholar) had a dream in which Sukayna asked him to move her body from the grave to another site, due to water pouring into her grave. He and some people opened the grave, and saw that ground water was indeed entering the grave, besides that her body was still intact. Sukayna's body was moved from its original burial place, the dungeon, and reburied where her Mosque is now located.
 
The mosque was built around the mausoleum in 1985 and exhibits a modern version of Iranian architecture, with substantial amount of mirror and gold work. There is a small mosque area adjoining the shrine room, along with a small courtyard in front. This mosque is found a short distance from the Umayyad Mosque and the Al-Hamidiyah Souq in central Damascus.

Family tree

Fatima al-Sughra 
It is believed that there were two daughters of Husayn as who had the name 'Fatima': Fatima al-Kubra ("Fatima the Elder") and was 11 years old during the Battle of Karbala, and Fatima al-Sughra.

Al-Sughra was a daughter of Umm Layla. It is believed that she was ill and left behind at Medina, when her father took part in the Battle of Karbala (680 ACE). Eventually, she accompanied her aunt Zaynab bint Ali to Shaam. She is believed to have died there, with her grave being in Damascus.

Fatima al-Kubra 
Al-Kubra was a daughter of Umm Ishaq bint Talha. According to the Shia, Husayn married Fatima al-Kubra (born 671 ACE) to his brother Hasan's son Hasan al-Muthanna. Fatima died in the year 735 ACE. Their children include: Abd Allah al-Mahd, Ibrahim al-Ghamr, Hasan al-Muthallath and Zaynab. The Progeny of Abd Allah al-Mahd are in Multitude of numbers which Include: Sharifs of Mecca, Hashemites, Idrisids of Morocco, Alaouites of Morocco, Shaykh Abdul Qadir al-Jilani. The Progeny of Ibrahim al-Ghamr includes Rassids of Yemen. The Progeny of Hasan al-Muthallath includes Al-Husayn ibn Ali al-Abid, also known as Sahib al-Fakhkh. As such, she appears not only to have been a contemporary of her father and brother Ali ibn Husayn Zayn al-Abidin, but also the later Shi'ite Imams Muhammad al-Baqir and Ja'far al-Sadiq.

See also 
 Adnanites
 Arabs
 Banu Hashim
 Family tree of Husayn ibn Ali
 Fatimah bint Muhammad
 Fatimah bint Musa
 Quraysh
 Ruqayya bint Ali
 Semite
 Umm ʿAmmar Sumayyah bint Khayyat, wife of Yasir ibn ʿAmir ibn Malik al-ʿAnsi
 Yahya ibn Zakariyya

Notes

References

Bibliography 
 Momen, Moojan An Introduction to Shi'a Islam, Yale University Press, 1985.

External links 
 Sakina
 Sakina, the young Hashemite princess
  Poem for Bibi Sakina(A.S) by Mahmood Abu Shahbaaz Londoni

Arab women
Tabi‘un
People from Medina
7th-century people from the Umayyad Caliphate
7th-century women
Women from the Umayyad Caliphate
Battle of Karbala
Husayn ibn Ali
Husaynids